Abu Sankoh is a Sierra Leonean football manager. He is the manager of Kallon F.C., a club he led to its first Sierra Leonean championship in 2006.

Sankoh previously managed the U-18 Sierra Leone national football team at the 2005 Meridian Cup.

See also
Football in Sierra Leone
List of football clubs in Sierra Leone

References

Living people
Sierra Leonean football managers
Year of birth missing (living people)